The following is a list of historic dukedoms in Europe:

Austria
The Austrian lands:
 the Duchies of Austria proper
 the Duchy of Carinthia (today in Austria and Slovenia)
 the Duchy of Styria (today in Austria and Slovenia)
 the Duchy of Carniola (today Slovenia).

The Habsburg dukes came to style themselves Archdukes.

Bohemia
The Czech lands:
 the Duchy of Bohemia
 the Duchies of Silesia
The Duchy of Bohemia became Kingdom of Bohemia in 1212.

France

Royal dukes

Non-royal dukes

Germany
Although the titled aristocracy of Germany no longer holds a legal rank, nearly all ducal families in Germany continued to be treated as dynastic (i.e., "royalty") for marital and genealogical purposes after 1918. Some maintain dynastic traditions that are reflected in roles they still play in high society networks, philanthropy and Germany's version of local "squirearchy" visibility.

At first, the highest nobles – de facto equal to kings and emperors – were the Dukes of the stem duchies:
Duchy of Saxony (now Lower Saxony)
Duchy of Franconia
Duchy of Bavaria
Duchy of Swabia
Duchy of Lorraine (replacing Duchy of Thuringia)

Later, the precedence shifted to the prince-electors, the first order amongst the princes of the empire, regardless of the actual title attached to the fief. This college originally included only one Duke, the Duke of Saxony. The ducal title, however, was not limited by primogeniture in the post-medieval era. All descendants in the male line, including females, shared the original title, but each male added as a suffix the name of his inherited domain to distinguish his line from that of other branches. From the 19th century, some cadets of the kingly houses of Bavaria and Württemberg, and all those of the grand-ducal houses of Mecklenburg-Schwerin, Mecklenburg-Strelitz and Oldenburg, took the ducal prefix as their primary style instead of that of Prince (Prinz).

There were many other duchies, some of them insignificant petty states (Kleinstaaterei):
Duchy of Arenberg, an imperial estate (county) from 1549, raised to princely county in 1576 and duchy in 1644
Duchy of Bavaria, elector since 1623
Duchy of Bremen (1648–1806)
Duchy of Brunswick-Lüneburg, divided into various lines, one of which became the electorate of Hanover in 1692, another became the independent Duchy of Brunswick in 1815.
Duchy of Franconia, the secular title of the Bishop of Würzburg
Duchy of Holstein, in union with Schleswig, in personal union with the Danish crown.
Duchy of Jülich and Berg
Duchy of Lorraine
Duchy of Magdeburg, the former prince-archbishopric after being acquired by Brandenburg-Prussia in 1680
Duchy of Mecklenburg, later divided into various lines
Duchy of Pomerania
Grand Duchy of Salzburg, the secularized prince-archbishopric 1803–1806
Duchies of Saxony, in Lower Saxony and Upper Saxony, the successor state(s) of the original (stem)duchy of Saxony after dismissal of Duke Henry the Lion by the Emperor, collateral lines of the electoral line (to wit: the Lower Saxon Saxe-Lauenburg and the Upper Saxon Saxe-Altenburg, Saxe-Coburg and Gotha, Saxe-Eisenach, Saxe-Eisenberg, Saxe-Gotha, Saxe-Hildburghausen, Saxe-Jena, Saxe-Meiningen, Saxe-Römhild, Saxe-Saalfeld, Saxe-Weimar, Saxe-Weimar-Eisenach, Saxe-Weissenfels, and Saxe-Wittenberg)
Duchy of Silesia
Duchy of Westphalia, a territory under the Archbishop of Cologne, either a successor-state of the original Duchy of Saxony, which was divided into Eastphalia (which later became Brunswick-Lüneburg), Engern and Westphalia
Duchy of Württemberg, became an electorate in 1803
Duchy of Zweibrücken

Ruling Dukes (as of 1918)

Non-ruling Dukes

On the Baltic south coast
The duchy of Pomerellen (Pomerelia; capital Danzig (Gdańsk), now in Poland) was part of the State of the Teutonic Order until its takeover by the Polish Crown in 1466.
The duchy of Courland (now in Latvia) was a Polish vassal state and once a colonial power from its foundation in 1562 for the last Master of Livonian Order, Gotthard Kettler, until 1795.
The Ordensstaat became the Duchy of Prussia in 1525, part of the dynastic home country of the later German (Hohenzollern) Emperor.

The Low countries (Netherlands/Belgium/Luxembourg) 

Duchy of Brabant
Duchy of Guelders
Duchy of Bouillon in the Ardenne
Duchy of Luxembourg

Greece

Italy

Kingdom of the Lombards 
The Kingdom of the Lombards was divided in several duchies, as follows:
 Duchy of Friuli
 Duchy of Ceneda
 Duchy of Treviso
 Duchy of Vicenza
 Duchy of Verona
 Duchy of Trent
 Duchy of Parma
 Duchy of Reggio
 Duchy of Piacenza
 Duchy of Brescia
 Duchy of Bergamo
 Duchy of Milan
 Duchy of Pavia
 Duchy of San Giulio
 Duchy of Asti
Duchy of Turin
 Duchy of Ivrea
 Duchy of Aosta
Duchy of Tuscany
 Duchy of Spoleto
 Duchy of Benevento (787–873 under Frankish suzerainty, then again Byzantine; later a principality, since 1051 held from the Pope)

They have been suppressed or transformed in counties as consequence of the Frankish conquest of the Kingdom in 776. Only the two southern duchies of Spoleto and Benevento were spared and survived some centuries.

Exarchate of Ravenna 
In the same period (the Early Middle Ages) also many Italian territories under Byzantine suzerainty (in the Exarchate of Ravenna) were organized in duchies, and notably the following ones:
Duchy of Amalfi
Duchy of Sorrento
Duchy of Naples
Duchy of Gaeta
Duchy of Rome
Duchy of Venice
The first four were Tyrrhenian port cities and survived as semi-autonomous states until the Norman conquest of Southern Italy in the 11th and 12th centuries. The Duchy of Rome was transformed in the Papal State as consequence of the Donation of Sutri in 728. The Duchy of Venice
became the Republic of Venice and its head of state retained the title of doge, equivalent to that of duke.

In 1059 Robert Guiscard, head of the Norman House of Hauteville, was created by the Pope Duke of Apulia and Calabria. When the State was raised to Kingdom of Sicily in 1180, the title of Duke of Apulia and Calabria was used intermittently for the heir to throne.

Kingdom of Italy (medieval) 
Since 1395 the major Signorias of the Kingdom of Italy (which was part of the Holy Roman Empire) began to be raised to Dukedoms by the Emperor. By the centuries more and more Dukedoms were created in this way and they became de facto sovereign states. The Duchies created after 1395 were the following ones:
Duchy of Milan
Duchy of Mantua
Duchy of Sabbioneta
Duchy of Montferrat
Duchy of Guastalla
Duchy of Modena and Reggio
Duchy of Mirandola
Duchy of Massa and Carrara 
The Duchy of Savoy, though it was not an Italian state, had suzerainty on Piedmont.

Papal States 
Also the Pope created some sovereign duchy during the Renaissance, notably:
Duchy of Ferrara
Duchy of Urbino
Duchy of Camerino
Duchy of Castro
Duchy of Parma

Kingdom of Naples 
In the Kingdom of Naples, the Duchy of Sora was a semi-autonomous fiefdom.

See also Historical states of Italy

In the Papal states and in the Kingdoms of Naples and Sicily the Pope and the king, respectively, granted the title of duke as the second rank of nobility, just inferior to that of prince. These dukes, however, always remained vassals.They include:
Duchy of Acerenza, created by the Kings of Spain and Naples for the ancestors of the Prince Belmonte
Duchy of San Donato, created by the Kings of Spain and Naples for the ancestors of the Prince Sanseverino
Duke of Calabria was the primogeniture for the crown prince of the Neapolitan kingdom.
Since 1081 the Duchies of Benevento and Pontecorvo had been two among the Papal states, and, in fact, no duke was appointed.

Kingdom of Italy (Napoleonic) 
A unique Napoleonic particularity was the creation by decree of 30 March 1806 of a number of duchés grand-fiefs. As the name suggests, these were duchies, but forming an exclusive order of 'great fiefs' (twenty among some 2200 noble title creations), a college nearly comparable in status to the original anciennes pairies in the French kingdom. Since Napoleon I wouldn't go back on the Revolution's policy of abolishing feudalism in France, but didn't want these grandees to fall under the 'majorat' system in France either, he chose to create them outside the French "metropolitan" empire, notably in the following Italian satellite states, and yet all awarded to loyal Frenchmen, mainly high military officers:

In the Kingdom of Italy, in personal union with France, personally held by Napoleon I:
Dalmatia (now in Croatia): for maréchal Nicolas Jean de Dieu Soult (1808, extinguished 1857)
Istria (now in Croatia): for maréchal Jean-Baptiste Bessières (1809, ext. 1856)
Frioul, i.e. Friuli: for the widow of general Geraud Christophe Michel Duroc (1813, ext. 1829)
Cadore: for Admiral Jean-Baptiste Nompère de Champagny (ext. 1893)
Bellune, i.e. Belluno: for maréchal Victor (1808, ext. 1853)
Conegliano: for maréchal Bon Adrien Jeannot de Moncey (1808, ext. 1842)
Trévise, i.e. Treviso: for maréchal Édouard Adolphe Casimir Joseph Mortier (1808, ext. 1912)
Feltre: for general Clarke (ext. 1852, extended 1864)
Bassano: for Hugues-Bernard Maret, minister (ext. 1906)
Vicence, i.e. Vicenza: for general Armand Augustin Louis de Caulaincourt, also imperial Grand-Écuyer (ext. 1896)
Padoue, i.e. Padua (Padova in Italian): for general Jean-Toussaint Arrighi de Casanova (24 April 1808, ext. 1888)
Rovigo: for general Anne Jean Marie René Savary (extinguished in 1872)

In the Principality of Lucca and Piombino, only Massa et Carrara: for Régnier, judge (extinguished 1962); Massa and Carrara were separated from the kingdom of Italy by article 8 of the decree of March 30, 1806 and united to the principality of Lucca-Piombino by another decree of March 30, 1806.

In the Kingdom of Naples : 
Gaete, i.e. Gaeta: for Martin-Michel-Charles Gaudin, finance minister (1809, extinguished 1841)
Otrante, i.e. Otranto: for Joseph Fouché, minister of Police (1809)
Reggio: for maréchal Charles Nicolas Oudinot (1810, main line extinguished 1956, but special clause of the letters patent authorizing a substitution were applied)
Tarente, i.e. Tarento: for maréchal Étienne-Jacques-Joseph-Alexandre MacDonald (1809, extinguished 1912)

In the states of Parma and Piacenza, ceded to France by the treaty of Aranjuez of 21 March 1801, shortly before both territories were united to the French Empire on 24 May 1808:
Parme, i.e. Parma: for lawyer Jean Jacques Régis de Cambacérès, author of the Code (the main European revision since Roman law, still influential in most democratic societies), Arch-Chancellor (24 April 1808, extinguished 1824)
Plaisance, i.e. Piacenza: for Charles-François Lebrun, also imperial Arch-Treasurer (24 April 1808, extinguished 1926)
Guastalla: for Camillo Borghese, brother-in-law to Napoleon I (30 March 1806, extinguished 1832)

In 1815 the Congress of Vienna created the last Italian sovereign duchy, the Duchy of Lucca.

Portugal

Spain

Sweden (Non-royal)

United Kingdom

References 

Lists of dukes
Dukes in Europe, list of
Peerage